, also known as Kodocha for short, is a Japanese manga series by Miho Obana. The series was adapted as an OVA by J.C. Staff and released on December 16, 1995 by Shueisha under their Ribon Video label. An anime television series was produced by NAS and TV Tokyo, animated by Studio Gallop, and broadcast on TV Tokyo every Friday from April 5, 1996 to March 27, 1998.

In 2002, the manga was published in North America in English by Tokyopop as Kodocha: Sana's Stage. In 2006, Tokyopop lost the license to the manga, leaving it out of print. In 2005, the first half of the anime series was licensed for North American distribution by Funimation Entertainment and has been released on DVD. In 2012, Funimation announced that their Kodocha DVDs went out of print.

In 2020, Discotek Media announced that they have rescue licensed the series for release on SD Blu-ray in 2021.

Both the manga and anime have been well received by publications for different media for the character interactions and the comedy. The manga won the 1998 Kodansha Manga Award for shōjo. At the American Anime Awards held in 2007, it was nominated for best comedy anime.

Plot
Sana Kurata is a cheerful, popular, and energetic eleven year-old child actress who attends an elementary school that is plagued with chaos, led mainly by an aloof boy named Akito Hayama. At first, the two come in conflict with each other because of their opposing ideals, but as they get to know each other, they start supporting both each other and their classmates and peers.

Characters

Main characters

At the start of the series, Sana is an exuberantly cheerful eleven year-old child actress who has been having a hard time at school due to the antics of troublemaker Akito Hayama. Sana sets out to stop him and bring peace to her world; however, she soon learns that there is more to Akito than it seems. While she is energetic and always has a smile on her face, she also has a short temper and fierce determination. She never backs down from a fight, especially against Akito, who she considers her rival, friend, and later on, her boyfriend.
Sana was adopted by her mother Misako as an infant after Misako found her abandoned on a park bench. At her mother's behest, she began her acting career at the Komawari Theater Troupe when she was five years old, and now stars in a popular variety program called Child's Toy, as well as several commercials. During the course of the series, her career flourishes. She stars in multiple TV dramas and a feature film. Sana also deals with many ups-and-downs of show business, such as competitive co-stars, rabid fans, zealous paparazzi, false rumors in tabloids, ruthless talent managers who try to poach her, and in the anime, even an imposter. 
From the beginning of the series, she developed a strong friendship with Akito and gradually falls in love with him, although she doesn't realize it until after he starts dating Fuka. They eventually start dating when they are in middle school.
In a 2009 one-shot called Deep Clear, Sana asks for help from a detective. In Deep Clear, Sana is separated from Akito because Akito told her to divorce him if she chooses to have the baby, but she longed to raise the baby with him. They reconcile when their daughter is born. Although they are married, Sana and Akito still argue.

Akito is the troublemaker who is causing chaos in Sana's sixth grade class. A sullen boy of few words, he is physically strong, and has a powerful karate chop. At the beginning of the series, it is shown that Akito has acrophobia. Akito's mother died when giving birth to him, which leads to his older sister Natsumi resenting him, frequently becoming angry with Akito and calling him "devil boy." In addition, Akito has a distant relationship with his father, who works long hours. As a result, Akito is not home often and usually eats junk food for dinner. Akito is disrespectful towards most adults in general, but upon meeting Sana's formidable mother, he speaks to her with deference. Akito gets good grades despite being a troublemaker.
After he butts heads with Sana several times, Sana succeeds in subduing Akito after blackmailing him, the same way he was blackmailing their teacher. Once the initial blackmailing passes, Akito ends up regretting what he did, and his friendship with Sana continues to open his heart. Sana also helps him have a better relationship with his family, after which they become even closer. Although he has his moments, he has had to grow up fast due to his tough home life. Smiling rarely, and laughing almost never, several characters note that Akito's eyes are not that of a child. Akito has his own code of honor: Akito will never lie, and he refuses to pretend to be nice to anyone he doesn't like or respect. Akito's most effusive expression of love is "I don't hate it", which he reserves for sushi, dinosaurs, skiing, and Sana. As the story progresses Akito's love for Sana grows, but Sana is oblivious to this until much later.
Inspired in part by Sana's devotion to her acting career, Akito begins to take karate classes. In the manga, towards the end of the story, Akito is injured and unable to move his hand. He moves to America due to his father's job, and the resulting shock triggers Sana's illness. When he returns to Japan two years later in the final issue, Akito has become a champion child karate fighter, as well as being able to speak flawless English.
In a 2009 one-shot called Deep Clear, Sana asks for help from a detective. In Deep Clear, it is revealed that Akito is living separately from Sana as Sana's manager, Rei, asked a detective to investigate him to see if he cheated on Sana. From Sana's memories, it was shown that he threatened to leave her if she went through with the pregnancy. Later on, with the admission of Sana and the detective's own powers, she came to understand that Akito is scared about the risks of a premature birth due to his past and doesn't want to lose Sana. They are reunited when Sana goes into labor.

Rei is Sana's manager. After being dumped by his girlfriend, dropping out of college, and his parents' death, he hits rock bottom and becomes a homeless person. While begging on the streets, Sana finds him and brings him home much like she does with stray dogs. Misako decided to keep him around the house, and he has lived there ever since, working as Sana's manager. Sana declares him as her "pimp" after reading a book which included the word, although she does not understand what it really means. In addition, Sana thinks of Rei as her boyfriend. Later, Akito tells Sana that Rei is playing with her, and sees her simply as a little girl wanting to play. Misako also tells Sana that Rei cannot be her boyfriend. This leaves Sana devastated. But after she gets over her heartbreak, Rei remains her manager and her friend. Through out the series, Sana looks up to Rei as a surrogate father as Rei looks up to her as his own child.

 is Akito's soft-spoken and smart best friend at school. Although usually gentle, when Tsuyoshi gets extremely angry, he flies into a rage and begins to attack everything - and usually only Akito can calm him. Tsuyoshi plays a very background role in the manga, but at the beginning he is Akito's rival for Sana's love.

Aya is one of Sana's friends, and later Tsuyoshi's girlfriend. She is a quiet and sweet girl, with a good deal of common sense, but when angry or jealous she can become very dangerous. Aya and Tsuyoshi become a sickeningly sweet "love-love" couple.

Fuka is introduced as a classmate when Sana and her classmates begin junior high school. Fuka just moved back to Tokyo after living in Osaka, and she and Sana become best friends. They start to meet at the bathroom, where Fuka complains about cutting her hair too short. Fuka explains that some people thinks she looks like Sana. It is revealed that Akito went to kindergarten with Fuka, and kissed her when they were five years old. Although Fuka initially hates Akito for stealing her first kiss, after getting to know him better, she is impressed by his blunt honesty and logical point-of-view. Fuka's personality is very similar to Sana's, which is why Tsuyoshi probably thinks that she is Akito's type. Fuka dates Akito when Sana goes to shoot a movie. Eventually, Fuka realizes that Akito really loves Sana, so she breaks up with him. Asides from the fact that they dated, Fuka was also the other girl besides Sana to whom Akito has said "I don't hate you" to. Although their relationship did not work out, Akito and Fuka genuinely appreciated and respected each other. She was in love boy named Yuta Takaishi, but they broke up because Akito kissed Fuka. When they meet again after while she said that she won't want to start relationship with him, but later Sana and Akito found out Takaishi's phone number and called him and get his phone number and address up and gave it to Fuka. First she was angry and embarrassed, then when she was home she thinks that she could call him someday and wonders what was that fuzzy and warm feeling that she felt, and also that she would thank Sana for this someday.

Naozumi is also a child actor, and another competitor for Sana's love. Naozumi has a history with Sana: when they were babies, they both spent time together at the Kamura orphanage. In the manga, when Sana's illness was triggered at a young age, Naozumi is the one who helped her recover (although Sana thought Naozumi was a girl due to his long hair). At the end of the series, Naozumi makes the painful decision to give up his love for Sana, but remains her loyal friend. In the final book of the manga, Naozumi leaves the country to film another movie and advance his career.
In the TV series, Naozumi is central to a major story arc in which he and Sana travel to New York City to be featured in a Broadway musical. During this trip, Naozumi unexpectedly encounters both of his birth parents. The trauma of these events bring him and Sana closer, and when they come back to Japan they start dating.

Asako is a popular actress. She was also Rei's girlfriend who dumped him to concentrate on her acting career, which partly triggered his downward spiral to homeless bum. She did not know that Rei would end up homeless. When she finds Rei again, she wants to get back together, but Rei says that he belongs to Sana now, and can't be with Asako until Sana grows up. When Sana realizes that Rei is not her "pimp" nor her boyfriend, Asako and Rei reunite.
 
 
 A mascot character that is a cross between a bat and a rabbit. Appearing mainly in the anime television series, it provides commentary on some of the events of the episode.

Family members

Misako is Sana's adoptive mother. Misako is a beautiful, intelligent, indomitable and goofy woman. She married a no-good gambling addict at age 18, and divorced him at 20. After her divorce, she decided that being normal just was not "her", and began wearing kimono, wearing her hair in odd ways, and felt liberated by being eccentric. She found Sana on a park bench and took her to the Kamura orphanage until she officially adopted her. When Sana was only five, Misako vows to be a famous author, and asks Sana to become better known than the average girl by becoming a small-time actress, so that they could find Sana's real mother one day. Misako and Sana are successful in their efforts beyond their original goals: Misako becomes an award-winning novelist, and Sana becomes one of the most popular child stars of her day. Misako then writes a controversial book named "My Daughter and I", hoping to find Sana's real mother.
Misako loves Sana deeply, and raises Sana with a balance between discipline and letting her be independent, thereby teaching her not to be a spoiled child. While Misako lets Sana make much of her own decisions, she will also not let Sana avoid the consequences of her actions. And when it comes time for Sana to realize that Rei is not her boyfriend, Misako holds nothing back, despite knowing that Sana will be hurt and humiliated. Misako also takes a liking to Akito: after learning that Akito kissed Sana, Misako tells him, "Do it as much as possible. It's fun!"

Akito's older sister. Natsumi is an avid Sana-fan. As a result of grief and stress from growing up without a mother and having to take care of a younger brother, Natsumi is pretty mean to Akito and accuses him of causing their mother's death. She often yells at him and calls him a "devil." (She calls him "Monster" in the American version of the anime and "Demon" in the Japanese version of the anime.) After Sana scolds her and her father, and Natsumi watches a TV drama that Sana filmed, Natsumi realizes that they are mistreating Akito, and starts being nicer to him. Also showing the fact that she becomes overprotective of him which shows in the last episode when she freaks out when she sees him in bandages. Like her brother, she has a difficult personality but she's also very intelligent.

Akito's father is a business executive who works long hours and is seldom home. Although it seems in the beginning that he is a bad father, Mr. Hayama turns out to be a good father who was simply unaware of the bad relationship between his children because he was working too hard. After realizing Akito's suffering, and also becoming ill due to working too hard, he begins to spend more time at home. When Akito gets into various scrapes during the series, Mr. Hayama always believes in his son and supports him, even when no one else does. This could partially be attributed to the fact that he and Akito's mother were troublemakers in their younger years.
Mr. Hayama is very mellow and soft-spoken, but the few moments he breaks out of his quiet mode are very funny. He takes a great liking to Sana and develops a goofy habit of talking to the TV whenever she appears.

Akito's mother who died giving birth to him, an event which had a serious negative effect on the relationship between Akito and his family. Although she has been dead for more than ten years by the beginning of the series: she "appears" sporadically throughout the manga in memories, photos, and flashbacks. In volume 8, when Akito is needing surgery, Koharu appears and tells him that he is too young to die and that he can be strong. When Akito realizes that she is his mother, Koharu tells Akito that she loves him and that he must live for both of them.
Aono Ohki

Tsuyoshi's adorable little sister. She is a fan of Sana. Aono carries around a store-bought egg in the hope that one day it will hatch into a chicken. One day, Sana buys a chick, and swaps it with Aono's egg when she isn't looking. Akito calls Sana an idiot for doing this because someday, Aono will realize what happened, and will feel stupid and humiliated. But Sana insists that as a child you should have dreams, and that the happiness it will bring Aono will be worth the small amount of grief later, because grief goes away, but happy memories are forever.

Sana's birth mother, a very shy and insecure young woman who gave birth to Sana when she was only 14. In the manga it is revealed that her uncle made her pregnant, and she gave birth in a bathtub. Keiko says that she was very much in love with Sana's birth father, but that he has died. When Misako finally meets her, after Keiko offers proof about her bond to Sana, she slaps Keiko and says that even animals know they have to take care of their offspring. She also arranges Sana to meet her. Sana was worried about meeting Keiko, because she was afraid that Misako would give her up; she finds out that Misako had the same worry, that Sana would leave with Keiko. After meeting Keiko, Sana and Misako conclude that it's what in the heart that defines your family, and that they are truly mother and daughter. After meeting Sana, Keiko asks if it is possible that one day Sana would come to live with her. Sana gently but firmly says that she considers Misako as her mom, although she's grateful to Keiko for bringing her to the world.

Sana's little sister, who is Keiko's daughter. She appears in a total of four pages, but also on the cover of the final book. She is a fan of Sana, not knowing that Sana is her older sister. After meeting Keiko, Sana spends one day having fun at a theme park with Akito, Tsuyoshi and Mariko. Although Sana enjoys her day with Mariko, she realizes that she doesn't feel a familial bond with her or Keiko. Episode 023 of the anime is dedicated to Mariko, where she wanders off to see Sana when a remote for Child's Toy is shot right by her house. She then gets on the channel 108 bus, unbeknownst to everyone but Zenjiro, and then wanders around the studio. Keiko ends up calling Misako for help in finding her "lost" daughter.

School characters

A boy in Sana's 6th grade class. He had long hair, but his father makes him shave it all off when he starts middle school. When Akito decides not to terrorize the teachers anymore, Gomi decides he will be the leader, but gets beat down by Akito (with Sana's one-time permission). In a story arc that showcases Akito's integrity, Gomi rebels against his parents who pressure him to attend a prestigious middle school. Gomi beats Akito up with the help of older delinquents, and shoplifts, letting Akito take the blame. He later confesses and apologizes to Akito.

Hisae is one of Sana and Aya's school friends who stays throughout the series. When Sana forgets to attend her birthday party, she becomes very angry and tries to ostracize Sana, but forgives her later. She and Gomi fight a lot but they are close friends despite that.

Mami is one of Sana's friends. She is a quiet girl, with short black hair kept back by a hairband. During Akito's troublemaker days, she calls Akito a "devil", the same word his sister uses to insult him. Akito gets revenge by getting the other boys to throw Mami into a pond, which causes Sana to become angrier than she's ever been. Mami remains traumatized by this incident for quite a while afterwards. She remains so afraid of Akito that when he tries to talk to her, she screams and cries. But when she sees that Akito regrets what he did, they get over it.

The principal of Jinbo Elementary School. Narunaru is popular, easy-going, and always says "Everything will be all right." The only time he's ever gotten mad is when he learned that Akito once made Miss Mitsuya cry. It was Principal Narunaru who suggests that Akito study karate. His near-identical older twin brother is the principal of Jinbo Middle School.

Tanaka is the P.E. Coach and teacher.

She wears contemporary horn-rimmed glasses, and a considerable amount of makeup. She is considered the school's bossiest teacher and frequently gets angry at the children. When she gets mad, usually after a child (mostly Akito) comments that her "real face is showing", her makeup cracks off her face prompting her to reapply it quickly. She also has a crush on Zenjiro, and is quite fond of the limbo. While mean, she's stated that the real reason she became a teacher was to make children happy, but she began worrying about losing face with the students and started worrying more about discipline.

Akito's homeroom teacher in middle school. Sengoku despises Akito and picks on him relentlessly. He believes Akito is a violent and dangerous boy by nature and cannot be changed. Akito, on the other hand, pegs Sengoku as the unfair and spiteful person he is, and refuses to curry Sengoku's favor. Sengoku once hits Akito, but will not admit it, and tries on several occasions to get Akito expelled.

Show business colleagues

Director of the Mizu no Yakata movie Naozumi & Sana starred in. He likes to take risks in his movies that put both himself & his crew in danger. He has long black hair & a huge scar on his face.

A young singer, about the same age as Sana herself. Tobita is a strict actress who takes her work seriously to the point of being stuck-up. She regards Sana as a rival and finds Sana's laid-back attitude extremely irritating. She also gets jealous when Naozumi talks to Sana.

She appears alongside Mayu. Tomomi is a very quiet girl, but can be persuasive if she wishes to be. She, Mayu, and Sana together form the singing group .
 

A regular character in the anime television series, Zenjiro hosts the Child's Toy television series that Sana appears in. His character is a parody of hosts on Japanese television variety shows, and is voiced by the real-life television personality with the same name; he is also shown to have buck teeth. 
 Miho Obana
 The author appears as herself in some of the quiz-show styled recap episodes in the anime. She doesn't say much, only the phrase: "Obana here."

Other characters

Misako's ex-husband. He is a gambling addict who kept showing up over and over again asking his ex-wife Misako for money. But in the end he is thrown out by Misako with some random gadget she had recently purchased.

As famous male actor and is Sana's pretend-father in the Late Night Murder Mystery Theatre, and later revealed to be her biological father. Not long after they started working together, reporters started believing that they were actually father and daughter (they did not know they actually were yet) and Sana breezily declared that they were lovers. Takeshi is quite chilled usually. He is funny, and he shares a lot in common with Sana. He speaks slowly and can be very comforting. He enjoys surprising people in the wackiest ways possible; in the series he suffered from a chronic illness which is the reason why he doesn't get very large roles when it comes to his career.

An American version of Hayama, who lives in New York at Gary Hamilton's mansion. He is the son of the Maid, Ramsey (who looks a lot like Shimura). He looks exactly like Hayama, but with different hair and eye color. He also has complete opposite personality from Hayama. Brad is also arrogant, mischievous and is always seen smiling. He has feelings for Sicil but Sicil likes Naozumi, so this drives Brad to try and scare Naozumi and Sana into returning to Japan. He knows the Hamilton secret. By the end of the New York episode, he begins to like Sana and Naozumi.

An American female actress who works along with Brad. She's not able to dance because of an accident when she was very young. Brad is love with her and she on the other hand had a crush on Naozomi, but then her feelings changed after she found out that they were blood related.

Production

Some parts of the series are based on Obana's life.

Media

Manga
Kodomo no Omocha was originally serialized by Shueisha in the magazine Ribon from August 1994 to November 1998. Shueisha collected the 51 chapters in ten tankōbon volumes from April 1995 to January 1999. The series was published in North America by Tokyopop under the title Kodocha: Sana's Stage from June 25, 2002 to November 11, 2003. In 2006, Tokyopop was not able to renew the license and the English edition became out of print.

In 2010, Obana authored a crossover story called Deep Clear in which Sana and Akito interact with characters from Honey Bitter. In 2015, Obana authored a one-shot of Kodomo no Omocha for Ribon magazine's 60th anniversary issue in September.

Chapter list

Deep Clear (2010)
The crossover story, Deep Clear, was published in 2010, and takes place ten years after the end of Kodocha. Shuri, the heroine of Honey Bitter, is hired by Rei to spy on Akito because he had separated from Sana earlier. At this point, Sana and Akito are married and expecting a child. As she follows Akito, Shuri becomes good friends with Sana. She eventually discovers that the reason Akito separated from Sana is because he is afraid that she will die giving birth. When Sana gives birth, Shuri convinces Akito to face his fears by going to the hospital and seeing Sana and the baby. Sana gives birth to a daughter whom she names Sari. After their daughter's birth, Sana and Akito reconcile and begin raising their daughter together.

Days Without Anything (2015)

A special one-shot was published in the September 2015 issue of Ribon in order to celebrate the magazine's 60th anniversary. The story takes place between February and March of Volume 4 of Kodocha, after Misako's first essay has been published but before Sana begins middle school. Gonta, one of Sana's dogs, narrates his daily life in the Kurata household leading up to Sana's twelfth birthday, during which he and the other dogs destroy a gift Akito meant to give to her as they mistrust his intentions. Shimura catches them in the act and informs Sana, leading her to find Akito and thank him for remembering her birthday regardless; she also assures him that she's going to Jinbou Middle School with the rest of their friends, to Akito's secret relief. At home, Sana chastises her dogs and asks Gonta to be a little kinder to Akito, as he is one of her precious friends. Gonta reluctantly agrees, because although he is still wary of Akito, he trusts Sana and wants to protect her happiness.

Anime

An original video animation was produced in 1995 to mark the 40th anniversary of Ribon.

An anime adaption was later produced by Studio Gallop, consisting of 102 TV episodes, airing on the TXN network weekly from April 5, 1996 to March 27, 1998. The opening theme songs are 7 O'Clock News by Tokio (episodes 1-44) and Ultra Relax by Tomoe Shinohara (episodes 45-102); the ending theme songs are Panic by Still Small Voice (episodes 1-39), DAIJO-BU by Tomoko Hikita (episodes 40-74), and Pinch (Love Me Deeper) by Rina Chinen (episodes 75-102). The first 51 episodes covers the elementary school story arc, while the remaining 51 episodes cover the middle school story arc.

The series was first licensed by Funimation from Nihon Ad Systems, releasing the first 51 episodes on DVD. The series was partially broadcast on American TV in a syndicated Funimation Channel programming block airing on Colours TV and Los Angeles KSCI-DT channel 18.3. The first opening song, 7 O'Clock News, was replaced with Ultra Relax due to licensing issues via Johnny & Associates.

Discotek Media announced that they had re-acquired the North American rights from ADK to the series during a live Twitch panel from December 14, 2020, mentioning that 7 O'Clock News would be restored on the upcoming SD Blu-ray release of the first arc in November 2021 as rights issues had been resolved following the death of Johnny Kitagawa. The second arc will also be released in 2022 as a sub-only release.

Stage Production 
A stage play adaptation of Kodocha was announced in the March 2015 issue of Shueisha's Ribon magazine, to be written and directed by Akitaro Daichi, the director of the Kodocha television anime. Sana was portrayed by both Kokoro Okuda and Rio Ogura, and Akito by Yuga Aizawa and Rihito Itagaki. Additional cast members included Sogo Ito as Tsuyoshi Oki, Satsuki Usui and Mio Yoshimura as Natsumi Hayama, and Hiyori Arima, Masahiro Ezaki, Mari Kazama, Wakana Kawai, Keita Takahashi, Miu Takahashi, Mitsuki Nishida, Mirai, and Yumeka Yoshiwara as classmates.

The play opened August 20th, 2015 via Nelke Planning in Tokyo, and ran for ten days until the 30th.

Reception
Kodocha won the Kodansha Manga Award for best shōjo manga in 1998. Jason Thompson found the manga "joyfully weird [...] with good lines and funny details", calling the art quaint. Holly Kolodziejczak from Animefringe praised the series for its multiple elements such as mystery and romance that form a strong comedy. Additionally, like Thompson, he found the art quality despite the time its age. Dillon Font from the same site called it "very solid part of a manga collection." The reviewer compared it with the anime adaptation "sorely missing the insane quirkiness that Daichi's [the anime's director] direction injected into the anime series" which might leave the manga "dull." Allen Divers from Anime News Network recommended it to readers commenting it is "a solid story about a young girl coming of age that remains entertaining the entire way"

The anime adaptation also received the praise with THEM Anime Reviews' Carlos Ross who claimed "the frenzied comedy is the selling point of this anime, and sell it does." Zac Bertschy from Anime News Network praised the characters as likables and also liked the animation and music. Reviewing the series' 10th DVD, Carl Kimlinger from the same website as Bertschy said that while "neither the show nor Sana has slowed a whit in forty episodes" the material not as appealing as previous episodes.

References

External links

NAS webpage

1994 manga
1995 anime OVAs
1996 anime television series debuts
Discotek Media
Funimation
Gallop (studio)
Japanese idols in anime and manga
J.C.Staff
Romantic comedy anime and manga
School life in anime and manga
Shōjo manga
Shueisha franchises
Shueisha manga
Tokyopop titles
TV Tokyo original programming
Winner of Kodansha Manga Award (Shōjo)